Jagoo Chandrakant Shah (born 1953) is a Kenyan former first-class cricketer.

Shah made a single appearance in first-class cricket for a combined East Africa cricket team against the touring Marylebone Cricket Club (MCC) at Nairobi in 1974. Opening the batting twice in the match alongside Narendra Thakker, he was dismissed in the East Africa first innings by Roger Knight for 53 runs, while in their second innings he was dismissed for 8 runs by John Hutton. He took the wicket of David Acfield with his leg break googly bowling in the MCC first innings. Shah also played minor matches for Kenya prior to their membership of the International Cricket Council.

References

External links

1953 births
Living people
Kenyan cricketers
East African cricketers